was an airline headquartered in the  Shinjuku, Tokyo, Japan. It operates scheduled passenger services. Its main base is Hakodate Airport in Hakodate, with a hub at New Chitose Airport; both are in Hokkaido.

History 
The airline, initially known as Air Shenpix, changed its name to Air Transse in December 2004. It started operations on 13 March 2005.

Destinations 
Some flights went through New Chitose.

Service between Hakodate and Ōzora began April 1, 2006.

Fleet 
As of March 2007 the airline fleet included:

3 Raytheon Beech 1900D Airliner

References

External links 

 official website 

Regional airlines of Japan
Airline companies based in Tokyo
Transport in Hokkaido